Prince Cheng may refer to:
Prince Cheng of the First Rank
Prince Cheng of the Second Rank